The 2009 Euroleague American Tour inaugurated a yearly basketball exhibition Tour organized by the Euroleague in the United States. The aim of the Euroleague American Tour is to expose to American basketball fans a different basketball approach than the one presented by the NBA, a lot more similar to the NCAA one.

The Euroleague teams that participated in that first edition were Partizan Belgrade, Olympiacos and Maccabi Tel Aviv. On the other hand, the NBA franchises that played against them were the Denver Nuggets, the Phoenix Suns, the San Antonio Spurs, the New York Knicks and the Cleveland Cavaliers. The NBA rules that applied to the event combined with the fact that the opponents were all top class NBA teams led to consecutive losses for the Euroleague representants. In Partizan's case, things were even worse as they competed without future All-Euroleague point guard Bo McCalebb and power forward Lawrence Roberts.

Overall, in spite of the fact that Euroleague teams seemed unable to threaten their NBA competition within the United States, they demonstrated some of the advantages that make them high-class basketball organizations: Solid fundamentals, outstanding team play and some of the best players of FIBA Basketball like Theo Papaloukas, Miloš Teodosić, Aleks Marić, Ioannis Bourousis and Sofoklis Schortsanitis to name a few.

Participants

Games

See also
2010 Euroleague American Tour

External links
Official 2009 Euroleague American Tour Website

EuroLeague American Tour
American
Euroleague